M. S. Krishnan may refer to:
 M. S. Krishnan (geologist) (1898–1970), Director of the Geological Survey of India
 M. S. Krishnan (professor), professor of business information technology
 M. S. Krishnan (trade unionist) (died 2000), labour organizer and communist legislator